Lwala Hospital Kaberamaido is a hospital in Lwala Village, in Kaberamaido District, in the Eastern Region of Uganda. It is a private, community hospital, serving the district of Kaberamaido and surrounding communities.

Location

Overview
Lwala Hospital is a private, non-profit, community hospital owned by the Roman Catholic Diocese of Soroti and is accredited by the Uganda Catholic Medical Bureau. The original planned capacity was 100 in-patient beds.

Among the challenges that Lwala Hospital faces are the following:
1. Dilapidated infrastructure, insufficient and overworked personnel, insufficient medical supplies, demoralized staff and low remunerations, among other challenges. 2. The hospital lies in the Teso sub-region, which together with the neighboring Lango sub-region are endemic areas for Human African Trypanosomiasis, also known as sleeping sickness, a vector-borne parasitic infection that is transmitted between humans, domestic and some wild animals.

Hospital operations
The hospital started as a sub-hospital health unit in 1936. In 1992, it received regulatory approval to operate as a hospital.
As of December 2019, the hospital attended to 6,000 outpatients annually, on average. At that time, it admitted 3,553 inpatients, annually on average, with a bed occupancy ratio of 56.3 percent. There were 573 maternal deliveries every year on average, with a caesarian section ratio of 16.7 percent. At that time, patient user fees accounted for approximately 38.3 percent of total annual hospital income.

See also
Kaberamaido District

References

External links
  Kaberamaido policeman fatally shoots wife As of 15 August 2016.

Hospitals in Uganda
Kaberamaido District
Teso sub-region
Eastern Region, Uganda
Catholic hospitals in Africa
1936 establishments in Uganda
1936 establishments in the British Empire
Hospitals established in 1936